Lineman's pliers (US English), Kleins (genericized trademark, US usage), linesman pliers (Canadian English), side cutting linesman pliers and combination pliers (UK / US English) are a type of pliers used by linemen, electricians, and other tradesmen primarily for gripping, twisting, bending and cutting wire, cable and small metalwork components. They owe their effectiveness to their plier design, which multiplies force through leverage.

Lineman's pliers are distinguished by a flat gripping surface at their snub nose.  Combination pliers have a shorter flat surface plus a concave / curved gripping surface which is useful in light engineering to work with metal bar, etc. Both usually have a bevelled cutting edge similar to that on Diagonal pliers in their craw, and each may include an additional gripping, crimping, or wire shearing (for a flat ended cut) device at the crux of the handle side of the pliers' joint. 

Designed for potentially heavy manual operation, these pliers typically are machined from forged steel and the two handles precisely joined with a heavy-duty rivet that maintains the pliers' accuracy even after repeated use under extreme force on heavy-gauge wire. They usually have grips for better handling than bare metal handles; the grips may also provide insulation for protection against electric shock when working with live circuits, although most models are marked as not listed for such use. Some pliers are certified to withstand a specified voltage, e.g. 1000 V.

Some glass shops use a variation of these pliers as well.

Durability
Like most hand tools the durability and useful working life of pliers vary greatly according to load, the frequency of use, the specific design, and quality of the tool. They may be forged out of alloyed or unalloyed tool steel. For basic quality pliers unalloyed tool steel with a relatively low carbon content of 0.45% may be used. Top-quality pliers are typically made from higher carbon tool steel and alloyed with elements such as chromium, vanadium and molybdenum. In addition to being suitable for cutting soft copper and aluminum, pliers may be specifically designed for cutting hardened wire, such as piano wire or nails, by induction hardening of the cutting edges.

Typical uses

Lineman's pliers are used in the electrical trade to cut, straighten, and bend wire, and also to twist wires together when making splices. Lineman's can be used to strip wire and some types of cable, although wire strippers are more commonly used for this purpose as they can strip wire more quickly without damaging the conductors themselves. They can also be used to pull fish tape through long runs of conduit where the high friction makes it difficult to pull it by hand. Some pliers are equipped with a crimping tool for the purpose of compressing crimp connections.

Lineman's pliers can be used to bend or straighten sheet metal components, especially in cases where smaller pliers don't offer enough mechanical advantage. The square nose and flat side of Lineman pliers is particularly useful for creating accurate right angle bends. The durability of these pliers allows them to be used for tasks like removing nails and other types of fasteners.

Lineman's pliers are similar to needle-nose pliers: both tools share a typically solid, machined forged steel construction, durable pivot, gripping nose and cutting craw. The main differences are that the slender nose of the needle-nose pliers enable it to form small diameter bends, and position or support items in awkward places. Needle-nose pliers typically have a lower handle/nose length ratio, reducing the force that can be exerted at the tip. Also, needle-nose pliers tend to be available in smaller sizes (for electronics applications, they may be found as small as 1/10 scale of the full-size version).

Lineman's pliers may be used to cut steel screws up to #10, and virtually any dry-wall screw, although the thread form will be distorted.  Lineman's pliers sometimes include an integrated crimping device in the craw of the handle side of the pliers' joint. 

Lineman's pliers have a tapered nose suitable for reaming the rough edge of a 1/2" or larger conduit, or cleaning sharp metal from the inside of a standard metal knockout in an electrical enclosure such as a junction box or breaker panel. Some brands manufacture pliers (i.e. Ideal) with a narrower jaw, suitable for reaming smaller conduit.

As another function, although not recommended by the manufacturer, many electricians will utilize linesman pliers as a hammer, choosing to forego carrying a heavy hammer around. It is so common place that a common joke amongst the various trades disciplines is that “kleins” can be considered a “sparky’s” hammer.

References

Pliers
Electrical construction tools

hu:Kombinált fogó